Alto Paraná is a 1958 Argentinian drama film directed and written by Catrano Catrani. The film is based on the novel by Velmiro Ayala Gauna, “Los casos de Don Frutos Gómez”.  It was released on September 18, 1958, and rated PG 14.

The film starred George Hilton, Ariel Absalón, María Aurelia Bisutti, Carlos Gómez and Iris Portillo

Alto Paraná Department is a department of Paraguay.

References

External links

1958 films
Argentine drama films
Paraguay in fiction
Films based on Argentine novels
Films directed by Catrano Catrani
1950s Argentine films